Basa language may be:
Any of the Kainji Basa languages of Nigeria, such as Basa-Benue
the Bantu Basaa language of Cameroon
the Kru Bassa language of Liberia